Joseph Warren Beardsley (1820August 27, 1868) was an American physician, politician, and Wisconsin pioneer.  He served as the 14th speaker of the Wisconsin State Assembly and represented Pierce County.  In historical documents, his name is commonly abbreviated J. W. Beardsley.  The 1862 Wisconsin legislative manual and later works that relied on that source inaccurately listed his first name as "James".

Biography
Joseph Warren Beardsley was born in Herkimer County, New York, in 1820.  He was educated as a medical doctor and came to the Wisconsin Territory about 1845, working as a physician and surgeon in Johnstown, in Rock County.

In the mid-1850s, Beardsley relocated to Pierce County, in northwest Wisconsin, and operated a general store.  He became a leading member of the Democratic Party of Wisconsin in that county, and was active in the unsuccessful effort to move the county seat to Prescott, Wisconsin.  During the American Civil War, he was elected to the Wisconsin State Assembly as a Union Democrat, and formed a coalition with the Republicans in which he was elected speaker and Republicans received many of the other Assembly offices.

He died at Ilion, New York, in September 1868.

Personal life and family
The Beardsleys are direct descendants of William Beardsley, one of the first settlers at Stratford, Connecticut, who arrived in the country about 1635.

Joseph Warren Beardsley's father, also named Joseph, was the first white child born at Monticello, Otsego County, New York.  His uncles, Samuel and Levi Beardsley, were prominent lawyers and politicians in New York, and served in several elected offices.

He married Caroline Maxson and had at least five children.

References

External links

|-

1820 births
1868 deaths
Date of birth missing
People from Herkimer County, New York
People from Prescott, Wisconsin
Speakers of the Wisconsin State Assembly
19th-century American politicians
Democratic Party members of the Wisconsin State Assembly